Gédéon Ouimet (June 2, 1823 – April 23, 1905) was a French-Canadian politician.

Born in what is today part of the city of Laval, Quebec Canada, Ouimet served as the second premier of Quebec from February 26, 1873 to September 22, 1874. He resigned as party leader of the Conservative Party of Quebec in 1874 because of the Tanneries scandal which implicated the government of Quebec.

He was appointed to the Legislative Council of Quebec in 1895.

He died in Mont-Saint-Hilaire, Quebec in 1905.

The Quebec town of Grandmont changed its name to Saint-Gédéon in honour of Ouimet. A bridge on Highway 15 (Laurentian) was also named after him; the bridge crosses the Rivière des Mille Îles. It connects the municipality of Laval to the northern shore in what is now known as the town of Boisbriand.

See also
Politics of Quebec
List of Quebec general elections
Timeline of Quebec history
List of presidents of the Saint-Jean-Baptiste Society of Montreal

External links

History of the Quebec town of Saint-Gédéon 

1823 births
French Quebecers
Members of the Legislative Assembly of the Province of Canada from Canada East
People from Laval, Quebec
Presidents of the Saint-Jean-Baptiste Society of Montreal
Premiers of Quebec
Conservative Party of Quebec MNAs
Conservative Party of Quebec MLCs
Quebec political party leaders
1905 deaths
Burials at Notre Dame des Neiges Cemetery